The 9th PGA Golden Laurel Awards, honoring the best film and television producers of 1997, were held at The Beverly Hilton in Beverly Hills, California on March 3, 1998.

Winners and nominees

Film

Television

Special

PGA Hall of Fame

References

 1997
1997 film awards
1997 television awards